Hypocysta is a genus of butterflies in the family Nymphalidae.

Species
The genus contains 12 species.
 Hypocysta adiante (Hübner, 1825) – orange ringlet 
 Hypocysta angustata Waterhouse & Lyell, 1914 – black and white ringlet
 Hypocysta aroa Bethune-Baker, 1908
 Hypocysta euphemia Westwood, [1851] – rock ringlet
 Hypocysta haemonia Hewitson, 1863
 Hypocysta irius (Fabricius, 1775) – northern ringlet
 Hypocysta metirius Butler, 1875 – common brown ringlet
 Hypocysta osyris (Boisduval, 1832)
 Hypocysta isis Fruhstorfer, 1894
 Hypocysta calypso Grose-Smith, 1897
 Hypocysta serapis Grose-Smith, 1894
 Hypocysta pseudirius Butler, 1875 – dingy ringlet

References

"Hypocysta Westwood, [1851]" at Markku Savela's Lepidoptera and Some Other Life Forms

Satyrini
Butterfly genera
Taxa named by John O. Westwood